The Sutton Link is a planned new Tramlink line or separate bus rapid transit (BRT) in London, between Wimbledon or Colliers Wood via St Helier to Sutton.  As of 2020, it is the only Tramlink extension actively being pursued by the Mayor of London and TfL as part of The Mayor's Transport Strategy 2018 and the New London Plan.

Depending on the route chosen, the development could support Opportunity Areas at Wimbledon and Sutton, the South Wimbledon/Colliers Wood Area for Intensification, the Morden Housing Zone, and intensification along the route at Rose Hill. The extension would aim to support the delivery of at least 10,000 homes and thousands of jobs. The London Borough of Sutton council have also proposed a further extension to the London Cancer Hub campus as a long-term part of the development.

In February 2020, TFL endorsed Route Option 2, Colliers Wood - Sutton, operating as a tram route, as the preferred option, conditional on any changes that may force a reevaluation during the funding procurement period.

It was announced on 24 July 2020 that the extension has been put on hold by TfL due to funding issues.

History

Initial proposals
In July 2013, the then-Mayor of London Boris Johnson said  that there was a reasonable business case for Tramlink to cover the corridor between Wimbledon and Sutton, and a map explaining the planned routing and stops followed. It would leave the existing route just to the east of Morden Road and head along the A24 and A297 to Rosehill Roundabout, then the B2230 through Sutton town centre, ending at the station; a loop via St Helier Hospital and a possible extension to Royal Marsden Hospital also are shown. In the London 2050 infrastructure plan, an extension of the Tramlink to Sutton was given a medium priority with a timescale of 2030.

In 2014, a proposed £320m scheme for a new line to connect Wimbledon to Sutton via Morden was made and brought to consultation jointly by the London Boroughs of Merton and Sutton. The consultation aimed to gauge support for the extension, as well as for different routes proposed. The consultation offered three choices of northern terminus (Wimbledon, South Wimbledon on-street, South Wimbledon off-street), with or without the loop serving St Helier Hospital directly, and for the Sutton loop to either run entirely around the Sutton gyratory or divert north along the High Street. The results overwhelmingly supported the extension, with majorities supporting the northern terminus at Wimbledon, including a loop to serve St Helier Hospital, and running entirely around the gyratory. Although £100m from TfL was initially secured in the draft 2016/17 budget, this was subsequently reallocated. In May 2016, the current Mayor of London, Sadiq Khan, said he remained committed to the project however, and called on Sutton council to raise the shortfall in funding.

Transport for London consultation
At the end of 2018, a TfL consultation opened on proposals for rapid transit between Sutton and Merton. The consultation proposed three potential routes:

It had been proposed that options 1 or 2 would cost £425m as a segregated tram line, but also could be delivered at £275m as a bus rapid transit (BRT) route. Also, both options 1 and 2 had potential for a direct link between Wimbledon station (with option 2 the easier route) and a potential loop for a direct connection with St Helier Hospital. Option 3 however was only proposed as a tram route, at £300m, with Thameslink services terminating at West Sutton and Wimbledon. Services on the intermediate stations would however be more frequent as a tram service than currently. Work could begin in 2022, with aim for completing in 2025. Services to Wimbledon regardless of route would however be postponed several years to co-ordinate with Crossrail 2 works, due to the low capacity on tram platforms in the station and to limit disruption.

Preferred option
In their February 2020 report, responding to issues raised during the consultation, TfL announced their preference for a north–south tramway between Colliers Wood and Sutton town centre for £425m (in 2018 prices) on the condition of securing additional funding. It has been announced £70m from the Mayor's Growth Fund had been allocated to the extension with a potential further £30m being available in the next TfL Business Plan, subject to an acceptable business case and funding package being reached by 2020. An additional £50m has also been offered by the London Boroughs of Merton and Sutton. A further consultation will be held to confirm further design aspects.

References

External links 

Transport in the London Borough of Merton
Transport in the London Borough of Sutton
Trams in London
Modes of transport in London
Tramlink